László Czakó (born 5 January 1966) is a Hungarian gastroenterologist, medical researcher, university professor and the deputy director of the First Department of Medicine, Albert Szent-Györgyi Health Center, Faculty of Medicine, University of Szeged. He is a notable and respected scientist both in Hungary and around the world in the field of gastroenterology.

Life
László Czakó was born on 5 January 1966 in Szeged. He graduated from the Albert Szent-Györgyi Medical University, Szeged in 1990. He has been working at the First Department of Medicine, University of Szeged (until 2000 Albert Szent-Györgyi Medical University) since his graduation. He started as a research fellow and later he became a senior lecturer. Meanwhile, he was awarded a scholarship to the Department of Gastroenterology, Academic Medical Center, University of Amsterdam, The Netherlands and a postdoctoral fellowship from the Matsumae Foundation to the Third Department of Internal Medicine, University of Occupational and Environmental Health Japan, School of Medicine in 1994 then a postdoctoral fellowship from the Japanese Council for Medical Training, Department of Gastroenterology and Endoscopy, Toranomon Hospital, Tokyo, Japan in 1999. And this year he completed his PhD degree in pancreatology and then he took a Master's degree at the Faculty of Law, Attila József University, Szeged in Health economics. In 2003 he became an assistant professor. In 2005 he habilitated and was appointed to an associate professor (docent, reader) in 2009. He completed his Doctor of Science (D.Sc.) degree in Medicine, and he received the title of university (full) professor in 2014. His working papers were issued in both national and international prestigious professional research scientific journals, and 130 scientific articles and books were published. He presents her talks at several conferences and at the different science forums and he developed significant research and professional relationships. His scientific and professional activities involve writing a lot of books, taking active part in editing numerous issues and he enriched the medical literature with several books.

Committee Memberships
Hungarian Society of Gastroenterology
Hungarian Society of Pancreatology
Hungarian Society of Endoscopy
Hungarian Endosonography Club
International Association of Pancreatology
European Pancreatic Club
American Pancreatic Association
European Group of Endoscopic Utrasonography
European Society of Digestive Oncology
European Society of Gastrointestinal Endoscopy
Hungarian Society of Internal Medicine
Hungarian Society of Diabetes
Hungarian Society of Hypertension
Hungarian Society of Clinical Nutrition
Public Corporation of the Hungarian Academy of Sciences

Editorial Board Memberships
Journal of Gastroenterology (2010-2012)
Word Journal of Gastroenterology (2009-2011)
World Journal of Gastrointestinal Pharmacology and Therapeutics (2010-2019)
Frontiers in Gastrointestinal Sciences (2010-215)
World Journal of Gastrointestinal Pathophysiology (2011-2019)
Gastroenterology and Hepatology (2011-2015)
Journal of Gastroenterology and Hepatology Research (2011-2014) (Associate Editors-In-Chief)
International Scholarly Research Network Inflammation (2011-2014)
Journal of Hypo & Hyperglycemia (2012-)
Global Journal of Gastroenterology & Hepatology (2013-)
World Journal of Methodology (2013-)
Gastroenterological and Intestinal System (2013-)
World Journal of Gastrointestinal Endoscopy (2013-)
Journal of Gastroenterology, Pancreatology & Liver Disorders (2013-)
World Journal of Methodology (2014- )
Pancreas – Open Journal (Associate Editor 2015 - )
International J. of Gastroenterology Disorders & Therapy (2015 - )
Iore Journal of Gastroenterology (2015 -)
Gastroenterology & Hepatology International Journal (2017- )

Awards and honors
1994: “Research Award” (European Association for Gastroenterology and Endoscopy)
1995: “Medicom Glaxo Award” (award of the Hungarian Society of Gastroenterology)
1998: Young Investigator's Award (award of the International Association of Pancreatology)
1998, 2002: Award of the World Gastroenterology Organization
1999: “The most valuable gastroenterological publication of the year” (award of the Hungarian Society of Gastroenterology)
2000: “The most valuable gastroenterological publication of the year” (award of the Hungarian Society of Gastroenterology)
2001: “Magyar Imre” Award (award of the Hungarian Society of Gastroenterology)
2004: ”Bólyai János” Award (award of the Hungarian Academy of Sciences)
2005: “The most valuable gastroenterological publication of the year” (award of the Hungarian Society of Gastroenterology)
2006: „Markusovszky Lajos” award (Orvosi Hetilap)
2008: „LAM award” (Lege Artis Medicinae)
2009: “The most valuable gastroenterological publication of the year” (award of the Hungarian Society of Gastroenterology)
2015: „Markusovszky Lajos” award (Orvosi Hetilap)
2016: „Pro optimo merito in pancreatico-oncologia” award

Selected works
Zsóri G, Terzin V, Illés D, Szijártó LA, Boda K, Czakó L: Effects of a continental climate on the prevalence and severity of acute non-variceal gastrointestinal bleeding, CLIMATE RESEARCH 73: (3) pp. 187–194, 2017.
Dóra Illés, Viktória Terzin, Gábor Holzinger, Klára Kosár, Richárd Róka, Gábor Zsóri, György Ábrahám, László Czakó: New-onset type 2 diabetes mellitus – A high-risk group suitable for the screening of pancreatic cancer?, PANCREATOLOGY 16: (2) pp. 266–271, 2016.
Dobronte Z, Szepes Z, Izbeki F, Gervain J, Lakatos L, Pecsi G, Ihasz M, Lakner L, Toldy E, Czako L: Is rectal indomethacin effective in preventing of post-endoscopic retrograde cholangiopancreatography pancreatitis?, WORLD JOURNAL OF GASTROENTEROLOGY 20: (29) pp. 10151–10157, 2014.
Terzin V, Várkonyi T, Szabolcs A, Lengyel C, Takács T, Zsóri G, Stájer A, Palkó A, Wittmann T, Pálinkás A, Czakó L: Prevalence of exocrine pancreatic insufficiency in type 2 diabetes mellitus with poor glycemic control, PANCREATOLOGY 14: (5) pp. 356–360, 2014.
Seiler CM, Izbicki J, Varga-Szabó L, Czakó L, Fiók J, Sperti C, Lerch MM, Pezzilli R, Vasileva G, Pap Á, Varga M, Friess H: Randomised clinical trial: a 1-week, double-blind, placebo-controlled study of pancreatin 25 000 Ph. Eur. minimicrospheres (Creon 25000 MMS) for pancreatic exocrine insufficiency after pancreatic surgery, with a 1-year open-label extension, ALIMENTARY PHARMACOLOGY & THERAPEUTICS 37: (7) pp. 691–702, 2013.
Czako L, Hegyi P, Rakonczay Z Jr, Wittmann T, Otsuki M: Interactions between the endocrine and exocrine pancreas and their clinical relevance, PANCREATOLOGY 9: (4) pp. 351–359, 2009.
Czakó L, Szabolcs A, Vajda A, Csáti S, Venglovecz V, Rakonczay Z Jr, Hegyi P, Tiszlavicz L, Csont T, Pósa A, Berkó A, Varga C, Varga Ilona S, Boros I, Lonovics J: Hyperlipidemia induced by a cholesterol-rich diet aggravates necrotizing pancreatitis in rats, EUROPEAN JOURNAL OF PHARMACOLOGY 572: (1) pp. 74–81, 2007.
Czakó L, Takács T, Hegyi P, Prónai L, Tulassay Zs, Lakner L, Döbrönte Z, Boda K, Lonovics J: Quality of life assessment after pancreatic enzyme replacement therapy in chronic pancreatitis, CANADIAN JOURNAL OF GASTROENTEROLOGY AND HEPATOLOGY 17: (10) pp. 597–603, 2003.
Czakó L, Takács T, Varga IS, Hai DQ, Tiszlavicz L, Hegyi P, Mándi Y, Matkovics B, Lonovics J: The pathogenesis of L-arginine-induced acute necrotizing pancreatitis: Inflammatory mediators and endogenous cholecystokinin, JOURNAL OF PHYSIOLOGY (PARIS 1992-) 94: (1) pp. 43–50, 2000.
Czakó L, Takács T, Varga IS, Tiszlavicz L, Hai DQ, Hegyi P, Matkovics B, Lonovics J: Involvement of oxygen-derived free radicals in L-arginine-induced acute pancreatitis, DIGESTIVE DISEASES AND SCIENCES 43: (8) pp. 1770–1777, 1998.

References

External links

 

1966 births
Academic staff of the University of Szeged
Hungarian gastroenterologists
Living people
20th-century Hungarian physicians
21st-century Hungarian physicians